Kai Falkenthal (born 8 May 1965) is a German former yacht racer who competed in the 1996 Summer Olympics.

References

External links
 
 
 

1965 births
Living people
German male sailors (sport)
Olympic sailors of Germany
Sailors at the 1996 Summer Olympics – Star
Place of birth missing (living people)